Arla is a village in the municipal unit of Olenia, Achaea, Greece. It is located in a hilly area, 6 km south of Lousika and 25 km southwest of Patras. In 2011 its population was 335.

Population

See also
List of settlements in Achaea

References

External links
 Arla GTP Travel Pages

Olenia
Populated places in Achaea